The  (French) or  (Dutch), meaning "Stock Exchange Square", is a major square in central Brussels, Belgium. It was created following the covering of the river Senne (1867–1871). The former Brussels Stock Exchange building, of which it takes its name, is located on this square. It is served by the premetro (underground tram) station Bourse/Beurse on lines 3 and 4.

History
The Place de la Bourse was laid out following the covering of the river Senne (1867–1871), as part of the major urban works by the architect Léon Suys under the tenure of the then-mayor of the City of Brussels, Jules Anspach. Centrally located halfway down the Boulevard Anspach/Anspachlaan (then called the /), it served as the focal point of Suys' sanitation and beautification programme for the city. The development work on the entire district began in 1868 and the Brussels Stock Exchange building was inaugurated in 1873.

Nowadays, the square is used as a gathering place and many important events are organised there. Since 29 June 2015, it has been part of a large pedestrian zone in central Brussels. On that occasion, it was partially restored to its original appearance and was repaved. In the aftermath of the 2016 Brussels bombings, it was used as an impromptu memorial. On 11 November 2017, a major riot broke out from the square.

Buildings around the square
On the south-eastern side of the Place de la Bourse, the Brussels Stock Exchange building occupies the site of the former Butter Market, itself built over the remains of the 13th-century Récollets Franciscan convent. The eclectic building mixes borrowings from the neo-Renaissance and Second Empire styles in a profusion of ornaments and sculptures by renowned artists including Auguste Rodin. The building is to reopen in 2023 as a museum of Belgian beer.

On the opposite side of the square, between the arteries forming angles with the Boulevard Anspach, stand two eclectic apartment buildings, built in a similar style in 1884–85, ensuring the homogeneity of the square. On the northern side, at the corner with the /, the square has been distorted since the replacement of the Grands Magasins de la Bourse, following their destruction by fire in 1948, with an imposing building of shops and offices. This building, designed according to the plans of the architect E. De Heu and dated 1949, with a corner tower topped with a dome, was partially modelled after the old one, by recovering elements of the original building, especially balconies.

Location and accessibility
The Place de la Bourse lies at the conjunction of the Boulevard Anspach/Anspachlaan to the north and south with several smaller streets on its north-western side; the /, the /, and the /. Additionally, two sides streets, running along each side of the stock exchange building, lead into it from the south-east; the / and the /.

See also

 Neoclassical architecture in Belgium
 Art Deco in Brussels
 History of Brussels
 Belgium in "the long nineteenth century"

References

Notes

Bibliography
 
 
 

Squares in Brussels
City of Brussels
19th century in Brussels
Car-free zones in Europe
Odonyms referring to a building